Fumbisi Senior High/Agric School is a second cycle institution in Fumbisi in the Builsa South District in the Upper East Region of Ghana.

History 
The school was established in 1991. In the 2018/19 academic year, the number of third-year students, second-year students and first-year students were 529, 544 and 450 respectively. In 2018, the headmaster of the school was Francis Adajagsa. In 2019, the headmaster of the school was Cletus Aruk.

References 

High schools in Ghana
1991 establishments in Ghana